Lee Sung-jae (born August 23, 1970) is a South Korean actor. Among his notable works include the films Art Museum by the Zoo, Attack the Gas Station, Barking Dogs Never Bite, and Kick the Moon, as well as the television series Lie and How Long I've Kissed.

Career 
Lee Sung-jae in a short period rose to become one of the more versatile and popular actors in Korean cinema. After working for a time on TV (his debut was the MBC drama The Love of Two Women), he launched his film career with the romantic comedy Art Museum by the Zoo opposite superstar Shim Eun-ha. The success of this movie gave him considerable attention and led to him being offered many more roles.

After starring in Ghost in Love opposite Kim Hee-sun, Lee rose to prominence as the leader of a small group of thugs in one of the biggest box-office hits of the late 1990s, Kim Sang-jin's smash comedy Attack the Gas Station. Shortly thereafter he took a role in a very different kind of film, the accomplished black comedy Barking Dogs Never Bite, and his portrayal of a dog-hating lecturer who desperately wants to become a professor received good reviews.

In 2001, Lee acted opposite Ko So-young in A Day, a drama about a young married couple who wish to have a baby; he then appeared alongside Cha Seung-won and Kim Hye-soo in Kick the Moon, another wildly popular comedy by Kim Sang-jin. Lee also had a memorable turn as the villain in Public Enemy, a hugely successful film by hit director and Cinema Service founder Kang Woo-suk.

In 2004 Lee portrayed a mountain climber in the big-budget adventure/melodrama Ice Rain, which was shot in the Canadian Rockies, then played a ballroom dancer in Dance with the Wind, Park Jung-woo's directorial debut (Park wrote the screenplay for many of Kim Sang-jin's films). Other notable roles include real-life fugitive Ji Kang-hun in 2006's Holiday, and a sculptor in 2010 3D erotic film Natalie.

Among the television series he's starred in include 2008 romantic comedy Lawyers of the Great Republic of Korea, and 2012 hit cable drama How Long I've Kissed.

Filmography

Film

Television

Variety show

Awards

References

External links 
 Lee Sung-jae at Koom Entertainment
 
 
 

South Korean male film actors
South Korean male television actors
Dongguk University alumni
Male actors from Seoul
1970 births
Living people
Best New Actor Paeksang Arts Award (film) winners